Cavaco is a small town in Angola, located in Africa near the coast.

Cavaco River 

The town of Cavaco is associated with the densely populated Cavaco River where several bridges have been recently constructed.

References 

Populated places in Angola